Liad may refer to:

People
 Liad Elmaliach (born 1989), Israeli football player
 Liad Shoham (born 1971), Israeli writer and lawyer

Other
 Lycée International Alexandre-Dumas